The discography of the American rock band the Velvet Underground consists of five studio albums, six live albums, 14 compilation albums, six box sets and eleven singles.

The first line-up was formed in New York City consisting of Lou Reed on vocals and guitar, John Cale on several instruments (viola, keyboards and bass), Sterling Morrison on guitar and bass and Angus MacLise on percussion (replaced by Maureen Tucker in November 1965). On March 12, 1967 they released their debut album The Velvet Underground & Nico featuring German singer Nico. The album charted in the United States and originally peaked at number 171 on the Billboard album charts and produced two singles, "All Tomorrow's Parties" and "Sunday Morning", which did not chart anywhere. The album, produced by artist Andy Warhol, recharted in 2013 peaking at number 129.

VU released their second studio album White Light/White Heat, which peaked at number 199 of the Billboard charts. The album was more experimental than their first album, featuring a loud and aggressive musical style. The album was produced without Warhol and Nico for the first time. In March 1969 they released the third studio album The Velvet Underground, their first project with Cale's replacement Doug Yule.  It did not chart upon its original release. However, when reissued in 1985 it peaked at number 197 in the Billboard chart. One year later, Loaded was released by Atlantic Records, the first time by a major label. Compared with VU first releases, Loaded was produced for the mainstream, without thematizing sex and drugs. Although the songs were successful and popular in several music radios, neither singles, nor the album itself peaked in any music chart. It was the last album featuring Lou Reed, the last remaining founder of VU. After his departure, Yule became the new frontman of The Velvet Underground and toured together with Willie Alexander (keyboard), Walter Powers (bass guitar), Maureen Tucker (drums) and other musicians. In 1973, he recorded their fifth and last regular studio album, Squeeze, which for some time dropped out of the official discography. After their break-off, several compilation albums were released, some of which feature outtakes from their previous studio sessions, most notably VU, which peaked at number 85 on Billboard and 47 on the UK Albums Chart.

Albums

Studio albums

Notes
A Upon its release in 1967 the album peaked in the US at 171. Shortly after the death of Lou Reed in 2013 it recharted for one week and peaked at 129.Likewise in the UK, where the album did not chart until 1994 when it reached 59, it recharted at 43 shortly after Reed's death in 2013.
B The album did not chart in its original release in 1969, but did chart on its reissue in 1985 when it peaked at 197.
C The album appeared at number two on Billboards Bubbling Under the Top LPs chart for the week of January 30, 1971.

Live albums

Compilations

Notes
D 2002 reissue

Box sets

Singles

See also
List of songs by The Velvet Underground

References

Discography
Discographies of American artists
Discographies of British artists
Rock music group discographies